Sir Charles Augustus FitzRoy,  (10 June 179616 February 1858) was a British military officer, politician and member of the aristocracy, who held governorships in several British colonies during the 19th century.

Family and peerage
Charles was born in Derbyshire England, the eldest son of General Lord Charles FitzRoy and Frances Mundy. His grandfather, Augustus FitzRoy, 3rd Duke of Grafton, was the Prime Minister of Great Britain from 1768 to 1770. He was notably a sixth-generation descendant of King Charles II and the 1st Duchess of Cleveland; the surname FitzRoy stems from this illegitimacy.

Charles' half brother Robert FitzRoy would become a pioneering meteorologist and surveyor, Captain of HMS Beagle, and later Governor of New Zealand.

Early life
Charles FitzRoy was educated at Harrow School in London, before receiving a commission in the Royal Horse Guards regiment of the British Army at the age of 16. Just after his 19th birthday, FitzRoy's regiment took part in the Battle of Waterloo, where as an extra aide-de-camp on Wellington's staff he was wounded. He travelled to Lower Canada with the Duke of Richmond in 1818. On 11 March 1820, he married Lady Mary Lennox (daughter of the Duke of Richmond), just after his promotion to Captain. In 1825, he was promoted to the rank of lieutenant-colonel and appointed Deputy Adjutant General of the Cape Colony (now the Cape of Good Hope).

Governor of Prince Edward Island and the Leeward Islands
Sir Charles was appointed as the eleventh Governor of Prince Edward Island off the coast of Canada on 31 March 1837, and was granted a knighthood just before his departure. He returned to England in 1841 and shortly afterwards was made Governor of the Leeward Islands in the West Indies until 1845.

Governor of New South Wales
Sir Charles was chosen as the tenth Governor of the colony of New South Wales by Lord Stanley in 1845. FitzRoy replaced Sir George Gipps as governor who had been a strong ruler but had provoked the animosity of many in the colony. It is likely that FitzRoy was chosen because he tended to be more appeasing in his approach. FitzRoy, his wife and his son George arrived in the colony on board  on 2 August 1846. Soon after his arrival he was asked to use his influence to procure the disallowance of an act of the Tasmanian legislature imposing a duty of 15% on products imported from New South Wales.

Fitzroy brought before the British government the advisability of some superior functionary being appointed, to whom all measures passed by local legislatures should be referred before being assented to. In the long discussion over the separation of the Port Phillip district, Fitzroy showed tact and himself favoured bi-cameral legislatures for the new constitutions. The need for some type of federation between the various colonies was recognised, and as a step towards this Fitzroy was given a commission in 1850 appointing him governor-general of the Australian colonies. During his governorship great steps were made in the development of New South Wales. Transportation of convicts ceased, the Sydney University was founded, a branch of the royal mint was established and responsible government was granted.
In 1847, Fitzroy served briefly as Governor of the Colony of North Australia, although his lieutenant-governor, George Barney had the main responsibility for establishing the new colony under FitzRoy's direction. His decision in 1847 to allow the building of a horse racing track in Parramatta was the catalyst for the creation of Cumberland Oval, a venue which hosted racing, cricket, and in the 20th century, motorsports & was the location that Parramatta Stadium and further on the Western Sydney Stadium were built upon.

After sixteen months in the colony, Sir Charles' wife Mary was killed in a coach accident on 7 December 1847. A distraught FitzRoy considered resigning and returning to England, but his finances did not permit it. A memorial to Lady Mary Fitzroy is in St James' Church, Sydney.

In 1850, Governor FitzRoy received the gold miner and entrepreneur, Edward Hargraves after he had discovered traces of gold at Ophir, New South Wales.

In 1851 he named Grafton, New South Wales, after his grandfather Augustus FitzRoy, 3rd Duke of Grafton.

Sir Charles remained in New South Wales for eight eventful years, which saw many changes take place in the Australian colonies, not in the least being the first tentative steps towards Federation of the Australian states. In 1853, FitzRoy was appointed as Governor of Van Diemen's Land, South Australia and Victoria – essentially a pre-Federation Governor-General of Australia, with wide-ranging powers to intervene in inter-colonial disputes.

Later years and death
On 28 January 1855 he departed Australia and returned to England. On 11 September, his eldest son Augustus (a Captain in the Royal Regiment of Artillery) was killed in the Crimean War. On 11 December, he married Margaret Gordon (widow of a Melbourne land agent).

FitzRoy died in Piccadilly, London on 16 February 1858 at the age of 61.

Family
Sir Charles Augustus FitzRoy married, firstly, Lady Mary Lennox (15 August 1790 – 7 December 1847), first-born child of Charles Lennox, 4th Duke of Richmond, on 11 March 1820. They had 4 children:

 Captain Augustus Charles Lennox FitzRoy (20 September 1821 – 11 September 1855)
 Mary Caroline FitzRoy (20 December 1823 – 22 November 1895) married Admiral Hon. Keith Stewart, son of The Earl of Galloway
Louisa Wilhelmina Stewart (1847-1938), married Kyrle Alfred Chapman, son of David Barclay Chapman and Maria Chatfield, did not have issue
Caroline Ethel Gertrude Stewart (1851-1947), married Canon Mark James, son of Colonel Philip James and Susan Ryder, daughter of the Hon. Granville Ryder, and had issue
Edith Stewart (died 1875), married Colonel Edward St. Aubyn, son of Sir Edward St. Aubyn, 1st Baronet and Emma Knollys, and had issue
Blanche Caroline Stewart (died 1927), married Admiral Sir William Shaw-Stewart, son of Admiral Sir Houston Shaw-Stewart and Martha Miller, and had issue
Ellinor Sydney Stewart (died 1901), married Spencer Chapman, son of David Chapman and Maria Chatfield, and had issue
Hilda Eugenia Stewart (died 1959), married Arthur Rhuven Guest, son of Arthur Edward Guest and Adeline Mary Chapman, and had issue
 George Henry FitzRoy (13 September 1826 – 8 July 1868)

 Commander Arthur George FitzRoy (20 March 1827 – 9 January 1861)

Lady Mary died from a carriage accident in Parramatta Park, outside Government House, in 1847. Within a year of her death, rumours were circulated about the colony of New South Wales about FitzRoy's 'womanising' ways. In 1850, FitzRoy made a visit to Berrima, to inspect the Fitzroy Iron Works. The Governor stayed at the Surveyor General's Inn, operated by former boxing champion Edward "Ned" Chalker (sometimes Charker). Ned's step-daughter, Mary Ann Chalker, who was 18 at the time, worked there. Nine months later, she gave birth to a son, named Charles Augustus FitzRoy, after his father, the Governor. This boy was later adopted by ex-convict John Fitzsimons and his family.

 Charles Augustus FitzRoy Fitzsimons (9 November 1850 – 19 July 1921)

Sir Charles Augustus FitzRoy married, secondly (after his return to England), Margaret Gordon, on 11 December 1855. There was no issue from this marriage.

Notes

References
 Prince Edward Island official website
 Biography on NSW Constitution and Government Education Department
 The Road to Federation and Beyond
 Biography at the Dictionary of Canadian Biography Online

Governors of New South Wales
Royal Horse Guards officers
British Army personnel of the Napoleonic Wars
Knights Commander of the Order of the Bath
1796 births
1858 deaths
C
Members of the Parliament of the United Kingdom for English constituencies
UK MPs 1831–1832
Colony of New South Wales people
Governors of Antigua and Barbuda
Lieutenant Governors of the Colony of Prince Edward Island
People educated at Harrow School